Daniil Aleksandrovich Nikolayev (born 14 October 1991) is a former Russian football forward.

Club career
He made his debut in the Russian Second Division for FC Dolgoprudny on 4 September 2013 in a game against FC Dnepr Smolensk.

Club statistics
Total matches played in Moldavian First League: 67 matches – 22 goals

References

External links
 
 
 Profile at sports.ru 
 Career summary by sportbox.ru 

1991 births
Footballers from Moscow
Living people
Russian footballers
Association football forwards
FC Zimbru Chișinău players
FC Vostok players
FC Khimki players
Kazakhstan Premier League players
Moldovan Super Liga players
Russian expatriate footballers
Expatriate footballers in Moldova
Expatriate footballers in Kazakhstan
FC Olimp-Dolgoprudny players